This list is of the Historic Sites of Japan located within the Urban Prefecture of Kyōto.

National Historic Sites
As of 1 August 2019, ninety-six Sites have been designated as being of national significance (including three *Special Historic Sites); Ishinokarato Kofun and Nara-yama Tile Kiln Sites span the prefectural borders with Nara and Lake Biwa Canal those with Shiga.

| align="center"|Naria-ji Old PrecinctNariaji kyū-keidai || Miyazu || ||  ||  || || 
|-
|-
|}

Prefectural Historic Sites
As of 1 May 2019, twenty-four Sites have been designated as being of prefectural importance.

Municipal Historic Sites
As of 1 May 2019, a further seventy-one Sites have been designated as being of municipal importance, including:

Registered Historic Sites
As of 1 August 2019, one Monument has been registered (as opposed to designated) as an Historic Site at a national level.

See also

 Cultural Properties of Japan
 Yamashiro, Tanba, and Tango Provinces
 Kyoto National Museum
 List of Places of Scenic Beauty of Japan (Kyōto)
 List of Cultural Properties of Japan - paintings (Kyōto)
 List of Cultural Properties of Japan - historical materials (Kyōto)

References

External links
  Cultural Properties in Kyoto Prefecture
  Municipal Cultural Properties in Kyoto City

History of Kyoto Prefecture
 Kyoto
Tourist attractions in Kyoto Prefecture